1.0 is the debut studio album by Black Rain, released on July 25, 1995 by Fifth Colvmn Records. The album was originally intended to be used as the score for the 1995 film  Johnny Mnemonic by Robert Longo.

Reception 
Sonic Boom said "the music does a much better job of backing up the film than the actual soundtrack does" and said "regardless of whither or not you enjoyed Johnny Mnemonic I suggest you pick up this soundtrack."

Track listing

Personnel 
Adapted from the 1.0 liner notes.

Black Rain
 Stuart Argabright – instruments, mixing, production
 Chaz Cardoza – instruments, production, mixing
 Thom Furtado – instruments, production, mixing
 Shinichi Shimokawa – instruments, mixing (1-12, 14, 15), production

Production and design
 Joseph Bartoldus – mixing
 Catherine Eng – design
 Zalman Fishman – executive-production
 Franz Treichler – mixing (12)
 Jim Waters – production (12, 13)

Release history

References

External links 
 
 1.0 at Discogs (list of releases)
 1.0 at iTunes

1995 debut albums
Black Rain (band) albums
Fifth Colvmn Records albums